Dirty Point is a summit in Cibola County, New Mexico, in the United States.

References

Mountains of New Mexico
Mountains of Cibola County, New Mexico